The Cup of Fury is a 1956 non-fiction work  by Upton Sinclair describing how alcohol affected the lives of many writers including Jack London, Ben Hecht and Hart Crane.

References

1956 American novels
Novels by Upton Sinclair
Literature about alcohol abuse